KOYT-LP (97.1 FM) is a radio station licensed to serve the community of Anza, California. The station is owned by Anza Community Broadcasting. It airs a variety radio format.

The station was assigned the KOYT-LP call letters by the Federal Communications Commission on October 2, 2014.

References

External links
 Official Website
 

OYT-LP
OYT-LP
Radio stations established in 2016
2016 establishments in California
Variety radio stations in the United States
Community radio stations in the United States
Riverside County, California